Arsenurinae is a subfamily of the family Saturniidae.

This subfamily contains the following genera:

Almeidaia Travassos, 1937
Arsenura Duncan [& Westwood], 1841
Caio Travassos & Noronha, 1968
Copiopteryx Duncan [& Westwood], 1841
Dysdaemonia Hübner, 1819
Grammopelta Rothschild, 1907
Loxolomia Maassen, 1869
Paradaemonia Bouvier, 1925
Rhescyntis Hübner, 1819
Titaea Hübner, 1823

References

 
Saturniidae